Alaysha Johnson (born 20 July 1996) is an American athlete who competes in the 100 metres hurdles.

A student at the University of Oregon Johnson is studying for a masters in sociology. At high school she was on the debate team and was named the Texas Gatorade Track & Field Girls Athlete of the Year award as a high school junior in 2013.

Johnson was the runner up in the 60m hurdles at the 2022 USA Indoor Track and Field Championships behind Gabbi Cunningham. Johnson was also runner up in the 100m hurdles at the 2022 USA Outdoor Track and Field Championships, this time behind Kendra Harrison with Johnson running a personal best of 12.35 seconds. That time of 12.35 placed Johnson twelfth on the all time 100 metres hurdles list, worldwide. Consequent from this performance Johnson was selected for the American team to take part in the 2022 World Athletics Championships held in Eugene, Oregon. Unfortunately for Johnson, the 100 metre hurdle event did not go well for her as she was one of a number of athletes to crash out and be disqualified, including her compatriot and the defending world champion, Nia Ali.

Team USA

USA National Championships

NCAA
Alaysha Johnson is a 8-time All-American, 2-time Pac-12 Conference Champion, 5-time All-Pac-12 Conference honoree, 3-time Big 12 Conference finalist & 3-time MPSF Indoor Track and Field Championships runner-up.
Johnson is #1 in Oregon Ducks Track and Field history in 100 m hurdles with her time of 12.69 seconds in 2017 and top 10 in the 400 m hurdles. Johnson is #2 behind Sasha Wallace in Oregon Ducks Track and Field history in 60 m hurdles with her time of 8.01 seconds.

Prep
Alaysha Johnson is the 2013 Gatorade Texas Track and Field Athlete of the Year, a 5-time high school All-American, 2012 Texas UIL 5A State Champion, 5-time University Interscholastic League state finalist. Johnson set Spring High School records in 100 hurdles – 13.98 & 300 hurdles - 41.24.

References

External links
 
 
 Alaysha Johnson bio USATF
 School of Journalism and Communication articles University of Oregon

1996 births
Living people
American female hurdlers
African-American female track and field athletes
World Athletics Championships athletes for the United States
People from Spring, Texas
Track and field athletes from Texas
21st-century African-American sportspeople
21st-century African-American women